John Michael Harrison (born 1944) is an American researcher, known for his contributions to the theory of operations research, in particular stochastic networks and financial engineering. He has authored two books and nearly 90 journal articles.

He obtained a B.S. in industrial engineering from Lehigh University (1966), a M.S. from Stanford University (1967), and a Ph.D. in operations research (1970) also from Stanford University.

He then worked at the same place, in the Stanford Graduate School of Business, as assistant professor, promoted to associate professor (1973) and full professor (1978).
He is currently the Adams Distinguished Professor of Management at Stanford University.

His research focused on stochastic modelling for business and led to influential results in option theory (with David M. Kreps, 1980).
Later he studied Brownian network models for logistics and models for optimizing telephone call centers. More recently he has studied dynamic pricing and revenue management.

In 2008, Harrison was elected a member of the National Academy of Engineering for fundamental contributions to stochastic networks and financial engineering.

Awards 
 National Academy of Engineering electee (2008).
 2005 class of Fellows of the Institute for Operations Research and the Management Sciences.
 John von Neumann Theory Prize 2004
 Frederick W. Lanchester Prize (best research publication) 2001
 INFORMS Expository Writing Award 1998

Selected publications 
 A Method for Staffing Large Call Centers, Mfg. & Service Operations Mgt., 2005
 A Broader View of Brownian Networks: Annals of Applied Probability, 2003
 Brownian Motion and Stochastic Flow Systems, Wiley and Sons, 1985
 Martingales and Stochastic Integrals in the Theory of Trading Stochastic Processes, 1981
 Martingales and Arbitrage in Multiperiod Securities Markets Journal of Economic Theory, 1979

References

External links
 Biography of J. Michael Harrison from the Institute for Operations Research and the Management Sciences

Lehigh University alumni
Stanford University alumni
American operations researchers
Stanford University Graduate School of Business faculty
Fellows of the Institute for Operations Research and the Management Sciences
Members of the United States National Academy of Engineering
John von Neumann Theory Prize winners
Living people
1944 births